Ray of Light is the second solo album by Malaysian singer Michael Wong, released on 8 November 2002. Originally titled 光芒 (Guāng Máng) when it was released in China and Malaysia, the international re-release was titled as "Ray of Light".

Track listing 
 Intro
 愛上她 (ài shàng tā)
 2999年的聖誕 (2999 nián de shèng dàn jié)
 我到底怎麼了 (wǒ dào dǐ zěn me le)
 若無其事 (ruò wú qí shì)
 握你的手 (wò nǐ de shǒu)
 漫步的太空人 (màn bù tài kōng de rén)
 講不聽 (jiǎng bù tīng)
 心甘情願 (xīn gān qíng yuàn)
 Hey Friend
 光 (guāng)
 私人空間 (sī rén kòng jiān)

2002 albums
Michael Wong (singer) albums